The Assam Valley School (informally Assam Valley School or AVS) is a co-educational private boarding school in Assam, India,which was founded in 1995 by the Williamson Magor Education Trust.  The school, spread across 270 acres, houses 890 students and is fully residential. It is a Round Square and Indian Public Schools' Conference member. Education World has consistently ranked the school among the top 3 co-educational boarding schools in India.

Notable alumni
Janice Pariat - novelist
Patralekha Paul - actor
Deval Tibrewalla - hotelier
Rukshana Tabassum - FIlmmaker

References

External links

Round Square schools
Private schools in Assam
High schools and secondary schools in Assam
Sonitpur district
Educational institutions established in 1995
1995 establishments in Assam
Co-educational schools in India
Co-educational boarding schools